Nham Biền is a township (thị trấn) and capital of Yên Dũng District, Bắc Giang Province, in north-eastern Vietnam.

References

Populated places in Bắc Giang province
Communes of Bắc Giang province
District capitals in Vietnam
Townships in Vietnam